Thomas Steven Wopat (born September 9, 1951) is an American actor and singer. He first achieved fame as Lucas K. "Luke" Duke on the long-running television action/comedy series The Dukes of Hazzard. Since then, Wopat has worked regularly, most often on the stage in musicals and in supporting television and movie roles. He was a semi-regular recurring character on the 1990s comedy series Cybill, and he had a small role as U.S. Marshal Gil Tatum in Django Unchained (2012). Wopat also has a recurring role as Sheriff Jim Wilkins on the television series Longmire. Additionally, Wopat has recorded several albums of country songs and pop standards, scoring a series of moderately successful singles in the 1980s and 1990s.

Life and career
Wopat was born in Lodi, Wisconsin, the fifth of eight children born to Albin and Ruth Wopat. His father was a dairy farmer of Czech descent. He was raised a devout Roman Catholic.

Wopat attended the University of Wisconsin–Madison and made his television debut on One Life to Live. He achieved fame on the television series The Dukes of Hazzard (1979–85), then embarked on a music career. He has recorded eleven albums. Musically, he switches between rock and roll and country music styles, though two recent albums have been of classic pop standards. His 1980s albums were on EMI Nashville. A 2005 recording, Dissertation on the State of Bliss, is a collection of Harold Arlen songs. Wopat first appeared on the Broadway stage as a replacement in the 1977 musical I Love My Wife, as Wally. He later appeared as a replacement in the stage musicals City of Angels and Guys and Dolls.

In 1981, he played the main character, Billy Bigelow, in the musical Carousel, at the Barn Theatre in Augusta, Michigan. He appeared in the opening cast of the 1999 revival of Annie Get Your Gun as Frank Butler, opposite Bernadette Peters, Cheryl Ladd, Susan Lucci, and Crystal Bernard, who played Annie Oakley (in consecutive order); he was nominated for a Tony Award in 1999 for his performance as Butler. He later appeared in revivals of Chicago and 42nd Street.

In 2005, Wopat appeared in the Broadway revival of David Mamet's Pulitzer Prize–winning play Glengarry Glen Ross as James Lingk. He starred in the North Carolina Theatre's production of The Music Man as Harold Hill in November 2006.

In 2008, Wopat starred on Broadway as the father of the bride-to-be in A Catered Affair, written by Harvey Fierstein (book) and John Bucchino (score), which opened on April 17, 2008 at the Walter Kerr Theatre. He received his second Tony nomination for that performance.

In July 2009, he originated the role of Frank Abagnale Sr. in the musical Catch Me If You Can (based on the film of the same name) in July and August 2009 at Seattle's 5th Avenue Theatre.

He was featured in the new musical revue Sondheim on Sondheim, conceived and directed by James Lapine, presenting the life and works of Stephen Sondheim. The revue premiered on Broadway at the Roundabout Theatre's Studio 54 on March 19, 2010 in previews and closed on June 27. He portrayed Ryan Hutton in the musical Lovestruck.

Marriages
Wopat was first married to Vickie Allen. That union ended in divorce. He is married to Kirsten S. Larvick, a filmmaker and audiovisual archivist.

Arrest
Wopat was arrested on August 2, 2017 on indecent assault and battery (felony) and drug (misdemeanor) charges in Waltham, Massachusetts, where he was about to open in a production of 42nd Street at Reagle Music Theater of Greater Boston.  The Boston Globe reported "According to a Waltham police report, Wopat allegedly assaulted the woman during a rehearsal at the high school on July 23. The accuser said he came up behind her and grabbed her buttocks and continued touching her in that area. The show's producer and manager had previously spoken to Wopat regarding complaints from other female cast members about inappropriate comments and touching, the report said. The artistic director told police he had spoken with Wopat three times, and the actor was also reprimanded for being intoxicated at rehearsal, authorities said." 

During his arrest by Waltham police on August 2, 2017, a search of him and his vehicle under warrant revealed "two bags of white powder believed to be cocaine." According to court documents, Wopat told police that he buys cocaine "in large quantities and uses it over time". Wopat pleaded not guilty at his arraignment on August 3, 2017 and was released on bail. 

On July 20, 2018, Wopat pleaded guilty to two counts of "annoying and accosting a person of the opposite sex" and was sentenced to one year of probation.

Filmography

Discography

Albums

Singles

Music videos

References

External links
 Tom Wopat's Official Site
 
 
 
 
 

1951 births
Living people
People from Lodi, Wisconsin
American country singer-songwriters
American male singer-songwriters
American male musical theatre actors
American male television actors
American people of Czech descent
Male actors from Wisconsin
University of Wisconsin–Madison alumni
Columbia Records artists
Epic Records artists
Capitol Records artists
EMI Records artists
People from West Milford, New Jersey
Country musicians from New Jersey
Country musicians from Wisconsin
Singer-songwriters from Wisconsin
Singer-songwriters from New Jersey